Darbiduiyeh (also Romanized as Darbīdū’īyeh; also known as Bīdu and Bīdū’īyeh) is a village in Jowzam Rural District, Dehaj District, Shahr-e Babak County, Kerman Province, Iran. At the 2006 census, its population was 148, in 36 families.

References 

Populated places in Shahr-e Babak County
Populated places in Iran